Sport in Lima is well supported by venues and clubs. The city of Lima has varied sports venues for association football, volleyball and basketball, many of which are located within private clubs. A popular sport among Limeans is fronton, a racquet sport similar to squash invented in Lima. The city is home to seven international-class golf courses. Equestrian is popular in Lima for which there are private clubs as well as horse racing which is centered on the Hipódromo de Monterrico. The most popular sport in Lima by far is association football with many club teams being located in the city.

Lima is the host for the following sports events:
 2020 U-18 Women's Softball World Cup
 2019 Pan American Games

Sport clubs

Sport venues
There are many sport venues in Lima including:

Football
Monumental "U" Stadium
National Stadium
Universidad San Marcos Stadium
Alejandro Villanueva Stadium
San Martín de Porres Stadium
Chorrillos Municipal Stadium

Other sports
Hipódromo de Monterrico (Horse racing)
Mariscal Caceres Colliseum (Volleyball)
Coliseo Eduardo Dibos Colliseum (Basketball and Volleyball)
Amauta Coliseum (Basketball and Volleyball)
Campo de Marte swimming pool (Swimming)
Terrazas de Miraflores Tennis Club (Tennis)
Lima Cricket and Football Club (Cricket, Rugby, and Association football)
Athletics stadium (Track)
Coliseo Polideportivo (Volleyball)

Other sports practiced in the city include surfing, equestrianism, karate, rugby, yachting, paragliding, badminton, squash, table football, mountain biking, bicycle racing, shooting, triathlon, futsal, table tennis, and track.

References